The 1st constituency of Aube is a French legislative constituency in the Aube département.  It is currently represented by Jordan Guitton of RN.

Description

It is located in the north east of the department, encircling the town of Bar-sur-Aube, and taking in part of the town of Troyes.

Historic Representation

Election results

2022

 
 
|-
| colspan="8" bgcolor="#E9E9E9"|
|-

2017

2012

|- style="background-color:#E9E9E9;text-align:center;"
! colspan="2" rowspan="2" style="text-align:left;" | Candidate
! rowspan="2" colspan="2" style="text-align:left;" | Party
! colspan="2" | 1st round
! colspan="2" | 2nd round
|- style="background-color:#E9E9E9;text-align:center;"
! width="75" | Votes
! width="30" | %
! width="75" | Votes
! width="30" | %
|-
| style="background-color:" |
| style="text-align:left;" | Nicolas Dhuicq
| style="text-align:left;" | Union for a Popular Movement
| UMP
| 
| 35.04%
| 
| 44.18%
|-
| style="background-color:" |
| style="text-align:left;" | René Gaudot
| style="text-align:left;" | Radical Party of the Left
| PRG
| 
| 27.99%
| 
| 32.01%
|-
| style="background-color:" |
| style="text-align:left;" | Bruno Subtil
| style="text-align:left;" | National Front
| FN
| 
| 25.29%
| 
| 23.81%
|-
| style="background-color:" |
| style="text-align:left;" | Pascal Landreat
| style="text-align:left;" | 
| CEN
| 
| 6.69%
| colspan="2" style="text-align:left;" |
|-
| style="background-color:" |
| style="text-align:left;" | Marie-Laurence Egmann
| style="text-align:left;" | Ecologist
| ECO
| 
| 2.08%
| colspan="2" style="text-align:left;" |
|-
| style="background-color:" |
| style="text-align:left;" | Lionel Paillard
| style="text-align:left;" | Far Left
| EXG
| 
| 1.53%
| colspan="2" style="text-align:left;" |
|-
| style="background-color:" |
| style="text-align:left;" | Elisabeth Marzé
| style="text-align:left;" | Miscellaneous Right
| DVD
| 
| 1.38%
| colspan="2" style="text-align:left;" |
|-
| colspan="8" style="background-color:#E9E9E9;"|
|- style="font-weight:bold"
| colspan="4" style="text-align:left;" | Total
| 
| 100%
| 
| 100%
|-
| colspan="8" style="background-color:#E9E9E9;"|
|-
| colspan="4" style="text-align:left;" | Registered voters
| 
| style="background-color:#E9E9E9;"|
| 
| style="background-color:#E9E9E9;"|
|-
| colspan="4" style="text-align:left;" | Blank/Void ballots
| 
| 1.99%
| 
| 1.83%
|-
| colspan="4" style="text-align:left;" | Turnout
| 
| 60.29%
| 
| 61.29%
|-
| colspan="4" style="text-align:left;" | Abstentions
| 
| 39.71%
| 
| 38.71%
|-
| colspan="8" style="background-color:#E9E9E9;"|
|- style="font-weight:bold"
| colspan="6" style="text-align:left;" | Result
| colspan="2" style="background-color:" | UMP HOLD
|}

2007

|- style="background-color:#E9E9E9;text-align:center;"
! colspan="2" rowspan="2" style="text-align:left;" | Candidate
! rowspan="2" colspan="2" style="text-align:left;" | Party
! colspan="2" | 1st round
! colspan="2" | 2nd round
|- style="background-color:#E9E9E9;text-align:center;"
! width="75" | Votes
! width="30" | %
! width="75" | Votes
! width="30" | %
|-
| style="background-color:" |
| style="text-align:left;" | Nicolas Dhuicq
| style="text-align:left;" | Union for a Popular Movement
| UMP
| 
| 39.97%
| 
| 60.64%
|-
| style="background-color:" |
| style="text-align:left;" | Line Bret
| style="text-align:left;" | Socialist Party
| PS
| 
| 23.06%
| 
| 39.36%
|-
| style="background-color:" |
| style="text-align:left;" | Marc Sebeyran
| style="text-align:left;" | Democratic Movement
| MoDem
| 
| 12.84%
| colspan="2" style="text-align:left;" |
|-
| style="background-color:" |
| style="text-align:left;" | Bruno Subtil
| style="text-align:left;" | National Front
| FN
| 
| 9.51%
| colspan="2" style="text-align:left;" |
|-
| style="background-color:" |
| style="text-align:left;" | Bruno Lebecq
| style="text-align:left;" | Miscellaneous Right
| DVD
| 
| 3.44%
| colspan="2" style="text-align:left;" |
|-
| style="background-color:" |
| style="text-align:left;" | Anna Zajac
| style="text-align:left;" | Communist
| COM
| 
| 2.35%
| colspan="2" style="text-align:left;" |
|-
| style="background-color:" |
| style="text-align:left;" | Pascal Houplon
| style="text-align:left;" | The Greens
| VEC
| 
| 2.17%
| colspan="2" style="text-align:left;" |
|-
| style="background-color:" |
| style="text-align:left;" | Michel Gueritte
| style="text-align:left;" | Divers
| DIV
| 
| 1.82%
| colspan="2" style="text-align:left;" |
|-
| style="background-color:" |
| style="text-align:left;" | Roselyne de Balmain
| style="text-align:left;" | Movement for France
| MPF
| 
| 1.26%
| colspan="2" style="text-align:left;" |
|-
| style="background-color:" |
| style="text-align:left;" | Monique Bonhomme
| style="text-align:left;" | Far Left
| EXG
| 
| 1.24%
| colspan="2" style="text-align:left;" |
|-
| style="background-color:" |
| style="text-align:left;" | Sébastien Fournillon
| style="text-align:left;" | Ecologist
| ECO
| 
| 1.04%
| colspan="2" style="text-align:left;" |
|-
| style="background-color:" |
| style="text-align:left;" | Guy Simard
| style="text-align:left;" | Divers
| DIV
| 
| 0.71%
| colspan="2" style="text-align:left;" |
|-
| style="background-color:" |
| style="text-align:left;" | Cathy Imberdis
| style="text-align:left;" | Far Right
| EXD
| 
| 0.58%
| colspan="2" style="text-align:left;" |
|-
| colspan="8" style="background-color:#E9E9E9;"|
|- style="font-weight:bold"
| colspan="4" style="text-align:left;" | Total
| 
| 100%
| 
| 100%
|-
| colspan="8" style="background-color:#E9E9E9;"|
|-
| colspan="4" style="text-align:left;" | Registered voters
| 
| style="background-color:#E9E9E9;"|
| 
| style="background-color:#E9E9E9;"|
|-
| colspan="4" style="text-align:left;" | Blank/Void ballots
| 
| 2.19%
| 
| 3.48%
|-
| colspan="4" style="text-align:left;" | Turnout
| 
| 59.16%
| 
| 57.99%
|-
| colspan="4" style="text-align:left;" | Abstentions
| 
| 40.84%
| 
| 42.01%
|-
| colspan="8" style="background-color:#E9E9E9;"|
|- style="font-weight:bold"
| colspan="6" style="text-align:left;" | Result
| colspan="2" style="background-color:" | UMP HOLD
|}

2002

 
 
 
 
 
 
 
 
|-
| colspan="8" bgcolor="#E9E9E9"|
|-

1997

 
 
 
 
 
 
 
 
 
 
|-
| colspan="8" bgcolor="#E9E9E9"|
|-

References

Sources
 French Interior Ministry results website: 

1